Misrod is a suburb of south-eastern region of Bhopal, Madhya Pradesh, India. It is located in Narmadapuram Road at NH-46 from Bhopal to Nagpur. Misrod has many residential areas like Aakriti Eco City near Arera Colony, Chinar Fortune City, Golden City, Bhairopur and 11 Mile Apartment near Mandideep.

Origination
Misrod name have been originated from the name of Nawab Misr-Un-Uddin Shah. The area had been known as 'Qutubyana' but after the defeat of Nawab of West Bhopal by Misr-Un-Uddin the area was conquered and renamed as 'Misrunuddinyana', which was renamed again after the war of independence as 'Misrod'

Places of interest
Misruddin Mehal
Raj Kothi
Bhopal Palace
Bhoj Lake
Misrod International Avenue
Yasoda Parisar 
Capital Mall 
Aashima Mall

Transport

Railways
As Bhopal Misrod is well developed area of South Bhopal. It is well connected with railways, roadways and airways.

Roadways
The direct buses from Itarsi, Narmadapuram for Bhopal Central City connects Misrod with Bhopal Cities several regions such as Bairagarh, VIP Road, Barkheda, Indrapuri, T.T. Nagar, M.P. Nagar, Bawadiya Kalan, Arera Colony, Kolar Road, Inayatpur, Kerwa Dam, Bhadbhada, Kaliyasot Dam, DB City Mall, Shyamla Hills, Hamidiya Road, Arera Hills, Rani Kamalapati, Saket Nagar, AIIMS, Govindpura, Ayodhya Bypass and Berasia Road.

Airways
Nearest airport is Bhopal Raja Bhoj Airport, which is located near Bairagarh and Ayodhya Bypass

See also
Bhopal Express
Bhopal Shatabadi
Rani Kamalapati
Mandideep 
Arera Colony 
DB City Mall

References
 Map of bhopal

Neighbourhoods in Bhopal